The Hillsdale Chargers football program is a college football team that represents Hillsdale College in the Great Lakes Intercollegiate Athletic Conference, a part of the NCAA Division II.  The team has had 28 head coaches (not counting "student coaches") since its first recorded football game in 1891. The current coach is Keith Otterbein who first took the position for the 2002 season.

Key

Coaches

Notes

References

Hillsdale

Michigan sports-related lists